Cheryll Boren Heinze (October 30, 1946 – July 10, 2012) was a Republican member of the Alaska House of Representatives from 2003 to 2005.  She comes from the Boren family of Oklahoma and Texas;  she was first cousin to both Hoyt Axton and David Boren.  She was an artist outside politics.

Heinze died on July 10, 2012, when the Cessna 206 she and four other people were traveling in flipped upon landing in Beluga Lake, near Homer Airport.

References
Notes

External links
 Cheryll Heinze at 100 Years of Alaska's Legislature

1946 births
2012 deaths
Accidental deaths in Alaska
Alaska Pacific University alumni
Artists from Alaska
Businesspeople from Alaska
Republican Party members of the Alaska House of Representatives
People from Wewoka, Oklahoma
Victims of aviation accidents or incidents in the United States
Victims of aviation accidents or incidents in 2012
Women state legislators in Alaska
20th-century American businesspeople
20th-century American women
21st-century American women
Politicians from Anchorage, Alaska